Nsit Atai Local government area was created in the year 1996 with its capital at Odot by the government of Gen. Sani Abacha. It has an area of out of an about 17,000 square kilometers, with 62 villages.

Location
Nsit Atai is located in south east Akwa Ibom State of Nigeria and is a local government area of Akwa Ibom state. It is approximately 50 kilometers from Uyo, the capital of Akwa Ibom state. It is bounded in the north by Uruan, in the east by Okobo, in the west by Ibesikpo Asutan Ekpe Local Government Area. It is on the Coordinates: 4°51′0″N 8°01′0″E

Government and politics

Representative:Rt.Hon. Mark Esset
Paramount Ruler:HRH Edidem Peter Okon Effiong 
Chairman: Rt.Hon.Emem Ibanga

Politics
The current chairman of Nsit Atai local Government Area is Rt.Hon.Emem Ibanga. She is the first female chairman of the local Government Area and a two term Chairman. She is from Ikot Akpabio Village in Afaha Ndisiak which is a sub-clan of the Afaha clan. She holds a bachelor's degree in political science and public administration.

People
Nsit Atai People are Ibibio outlined extraction with Ibibio language as the main spoken language. Cultural influences include Ekpo, Ekong, Eko-ong Utah, Egre and other traditional dances.

List of villages in Nsit Atai 

 Adia Nsit
 Akpang Offop
 Etobodom
 Ibakang
 Ibedu
 Ibiakpan
 Idiaba
 Idifa
 Idikpa
 Idikpa Ikot Ntung
 Ikot Abasi
 Ikot Abiaenyie
 Ikot Abiyan
 Ikot Akpabio
 Ikot Akpan Ike
 Ikot Asua
 Ikot Ebita
 Ikot Edebe
 Ikot Edong
 Ikot Eket
 Ikot Ekpot
 Ikot Esen
 Ikot Esop
 Ikot Essien
 Ikot Inyang
 Ikot Itie-Udong
 Ikot Mkpo
 Ikot Nkpene
 Ikot Ntuen
 Ikot Obon Nsit
 Ikot Otu
 Ikot Ubok Udom
 Ikot Udofia
 Ikot Ukpong
 Ikot Uyo Nsit
 Iwok Atai
 Iwok Nsit
 Iwok Obio Aduang
 Nda Nsit
 Ndisiak
 Ndon Ekpe
 Ndon Ikot Itie-Udung
 Ndon Omun
 Odot No.1
 Odot No.2
 Odot No.3
 Okoro Atai
 Okoro Nsit
 Ubetim
 Udofia
 Unyehe Nsit

Population
According to the 2006 census result, Nsit Atai has a population of 37,318 male and 74,595 females. This is a total of 101,915 people.

Education
Nsit Atai Local Government Area has decent levels of educational institutions. They are pre-primary, primary and secondary schools. There are 13 pre-primary schools, 25 primary schools, 9 secondary schools and 26 adult education centers. Most of the schools are in decaying and deplorable conditions. The teacher to student ratio is 1:50 students per class.

Health
Nsit Atai has one comprehensive health care center, one primary health center and two health posts. Some of the centers have been adequately equipped in terms of physical structures, facilities/equipment and personnel.

Natural resources
Mineral resources include crude oil deposits, commercial quantity of salt and high quality clay.

Agricultural resources include plantain oil palm and palm produce. There is a preponderance of hardwood, timber, and wildlife. Agriculture provides employment and means of livelihood to the people of Nsit Atai. The land is generally fertile but the fertility rate is very low due to continuous activities which results in low productivity, income and low standard of living.

Commerce
Most people have jobs as farmers and sundry traders.

References

Local Government Areas in Akwa Ibom State